Saurita bipuncta is a moth in the subfamily Arctiinae. It was described by George Hampson in 1898. It is found in the Brazilian states of Santa Catarina and Rio Grande do Sul.

References

Moths described in 1898
Saurita